Legislative elections were held in Kazakhstan on 10 October 1999, with a second round on 24 October. The result was a victory for the new Otan party, which won 23 of the 77 seats. Voter turnout was 62.5%.

Background
President Nursultan Nazarbayev announced by public decree on 7 July 1999 that the elections to both Houses of the Parliament (the Senate and Assembly) would take place on 17 September 1999 and 10 October 1999 respectively. 
The former Soviet republic, independent since 1991, wanted to project with these elections a democratic image because its January presidential election had been criticized in the West as unfair. For the first time, 10 of the 77 seats in the Assembly were contested on a party basis and opposition candidates were given access to the media.

Elections
International and domestic observers described the parliamentary election as flawed. The Organization for Security and Co-operation in Europe, that had deployed 200 observers to monitor the vote, reported that the election had fallen far short of international standards. It was alleged that innocent candidates had been treated unfairly and that voters had been pressured not to vote for certain candidates.

About 60 percent of the eight million registered voters turned out for the ballot which was a much lower turnout than the one for the 1995 elections, at which voter participation was 79%.

In the election to the Assembly, the ten seats allotted to political parties were decided in the first round on October 10, as well as 20 seats where candidates secured a majority. The remaining 47, where there was no clear majority, were decided at a second round which took place on 24 October.

Kazakhstan's election commission called for new voting to be held in three of the 67 voting districts. The new polls would be held in Atyrau city and the South Kazakhstan and Dzhambul regions. The Kazakh election laws do not allow the original candidates to run again in the new voting in these three districts.

For the Senate, on 17 September, deputies in the regional and city assemblies elected the 16 contested seats. Twelve of the new senators were nominated by Maslihats (provinces) and the other four were self-nominated.

Results

References

External links
Inter-Parliamentary Union Report on 1999 Kazakhstan Elections
Parliament of Republic of Kazakhstan
Central Election Commission

Kazakhstan
Legislative election
Elections in Kazakhstan
Election and referendum articles with incomplete results